Erwin Frink Smith (January 21, 1854 – April 6, 1927) was an American plant pathologist with the United States Department of Agriculture. He played a major role in demonstrating that bacteria could cause plant disease.

Life and career
Smith was born in Gilbert Mills, near Fulton, New York to Louisa Frink Smith and Rancellor King Smith. In 1870 he moved with his family to an 80-acre farm, which eventually included an apple orchard, in Clinton County, Michigan. The farm ultimately failed, causing the Smith family to move to North Plains Township, Michigan. Because he was no longer needed to help on the farm, Smith was finally able to attend Ionia High School, starting in 1876, when he was 22 years old.

Smith read widely and was largely self-taught in botany and bacteriology. In 1881, while still in high school, he co-authored a book on the flora of Michigan titled "Cataloque of the Phaenogamous and Vascular Cryptogamous Plants of Michigan" with Charles F. Wheeler. In 1885 he published a book on water sanitation. Smith also enjoyed writing poetry and wrote several poems about his boyhood, his childhood teachers, and even a poem titled "Evolution."

Poverty kept Smith from attending college after graduation from high school. Instead, he accepted a position at a Michigan prison, where he worked as a guard. While working there, he developed an interest in public health and sanitation and began reading about bacteriology.

Smith was accepted to the University of Michigan in 1885 and passed examinations for most of the coursework soon after acceptance, which allowed him to earn his bachelor's degree in biology after only one year at the university. Soon after earning his 1886 bachelor's degree, he took a position as chief of Plant Pathology in Bureau of Plant Industry. He earned his doctorate from Michigan in 1889. Throughout his career, he pursued the hypothesis that bacteria were significant causes of plant disease. Resistance in the field, most notably by Alfred Fischer, eventually gave way, culminating in his three-volume 1910 work Bacteria in Relation to Plant Diseases.

Dutch American botanical explorer Frank Nicholas Meyer worked for Smith in 1901, upon his arrival in the United States.

Erwin Smith married Charlotte May Buffet on April 13, 1893.  Their marriage was a happy one, but tragically terminated by Charlotte's death on December 28, 1906, eight months after she was diagnosed with endocarditis.  Smith celebrated his wife's memory in an elegantly produced book of poetry and biography entitled For Her Friends and Mine: A Book of Aspirations, Dreams and Memories (1915).

At a time when it was unusual to do so, Smith was known for hiring many women at the Bureau of Plant industry, including botanists Nellie A. Brown, Mary K. Bryan, Florence Hedges, Lucia McCulloch, Agnes J. Quirk, Angie Beckwith, and Charlotte Elliott. Historian Margaret W. Rossiter cites this as an example of a harem effect. In Smith's case, a factor in hiring women only as assistants may have been USDA's structural exclusion of women from taking the examinations that would have allowed them to enter the higher-ranking jobs for which they were qualified. Many of Smith's assistants praised him for giving them research projects suited to their skills rather than confining them to the more limited tasks presumed by their job classifications.

Smith died on April 6, 1927 in Washington, D.C..  His ashes were scattered at Woods Hole, Massachusetts.

References

External links
Erwin Frink Smith Papers via USDA National Agricultural Library

 

American botanists
American phytopathologists
American bacteriologists
1854 births
1927 deaths
University of Michigan College of Literature, Science, and the Arts alumni
People from Fulton, Oswego County, New York
United States Department of Agriculture people
Deaths from endocarditis
Scientists from New York (state)